The March 14 Alliance, named after the date of the Cedar Revolution, is a coalition of political parties and independents in Lebanon formed in 2005 that are united by their anti-Syrian stance and by their opposition to the March 8 Alliance. It is led by Samir Geagea, as well as other prominent figures.

History

Free Patriotic Movement's withdrawal 
The Free Patriotic Movement of General Michel Aoun left the informal grouping before the 2005 general election, before March 14 was an established alliance, due to major disagreements and when its leader Michel Aoun signed a Memorandum of Understanding with Hezbollah. After the 2005 elections, The Free Patriotic Movement was the sole political opposition, but one year later joined the pro-Syrian government March 8 Alliance in November 2006.

2006 Lebanon War 
On 12 July 2006, the 2006 Lebanon War between Israel and Hezbollah started. During the war, the 14 of March Coalition took a stance against Hezbollah accusing the armed party of causing the war on Lebanon. However, Hezbollah claimed that Israel preplanned such a war, supposed to be waged on September during the annual rally Hezbollah holds on the International Qods (Jerusalem) Day.

The 14th of March coalition, amidst the war, urged Hezbollah to hand over their weapons, accusing the party of causing the war on Lebanon.

During the first few days of the war, former US Secretary of State Condoleezza Rice visited Beirut and held a meeting with the 14th of March coalition and declared afterwards that a new Middle East will be born after this war, saying: "It's time for a new Middle East". Rice and Fouad Siniora met during her visit to Lebanon.

2008 clashes 
In May 2008, the tensions between the pro-government and opposition parties escalated when the cabinet announced a series of security decisions. Tensions began with revelations on Friday May 2 made by Progressive Socialist Party leader Walid Jumblatt, a key politician in the ruling March 14 alliance. He announced that a remote-controlled camera had been set up in a container park overlooking Beirut international airport's runway 17, which was frequently being used by March 14 politicians. In March 14 circles, fear was that the monitoring could be used for a possible attack on its leaders, as Lebanon had faced a series of political assassinations in recent times. Although Jumblatt did not accuse the party directly, he made clear that he thought March 8's Hezbollah was behind the monitoring system's installment. Hezbollah dismissed the accusations, calling the allegation a product of Jumblatt's imagination and saying that those who leveled them were scaremongering and simply parroting a US campaign against it and other groups which are resisting Israel. In addition to the monitoring system, Jumblatt stated that Hezbollah had laid down a fiber optic telecommunication network connecting its powerbase in Dahiya in South Beirut with cities and towns in South and East Lebanon in predominantly Shiite areas.

In its response to these allegations, the Lebanese cabinet announced that it regarded the telecommunication network and the monitoring system as a breach of law, undermining the state's sovereignty and the security of its citizens. Therefore, it declared that the matter would be referred not only to the Lebanese judicial system, but also to the Arab League and the United Nations.

Coincidentally, a day after the cabinet's decision, on Wednesday May 7, the Lebanese General Workers Union had planned a general strike to demand higher wages and decry high consumer prices. The strike turned violent as the opposition threw their weight behind the strike, paralyzing large parts of Lebanon's capital Beirut. Clashes later erupted throughout the country in the following weeks

Progressive Socialist Party's withdrawal 
In 2009, the Progressive Socialist Party left the alliance claiming political neutrality after the 2008 Lebanon conflict, though they still support lists of March 14 members mostly the Lebanese Forces. The National Liberal Party left the 14 March movement the 22 December 2016.

Claims

The principal political claims of the March 14 Alliance are:
 The exile of the former President Émile Lahoud, reputed an illegitimate president under the Syrian regime in September 2004.
 Institution of a court for a case against Prime Minister Rafic Hariri's killers.
 Pacification with Syria and review of the Syrian-Lebanese borders.
 Opposition to the Syrian interference in Lebanon.
 Institution of a weapons government monopoly, disarmament of Hezbollah and review control of the Lebanese Armed Forces by the President and general Michel Suleiman and the police by the Prime Minister.

Member parties

Current deputies

See also
List of attacks in Lebanon
March 8 Alliance

References

External links

Independence party Official Web Site
Kataeb Party Official website
National Liberal Party (Lebanon) Official website
Democratic Left Movement (Lebanon) Official website
Tajaddod/Democratic Renewal Movement Youth blog

 
2005 establishments in Lebanon
Politics of Lebanon